The men's canoe sprint K-2 1,000 metres competition at the 2012 Olympic Games in London took place between 6 and 8 August at Eton Dorney.

Rudolf Dombi and Roland Kökény from Hungary won the gold medal. Portugal's Fernando Pimenta and Emanuel Silva won silver — the country's only medal at the 2012 Games — and Martin Hollstein and Andreas Ihle from Germany took bronze.

Competition format

The competition comprised heats, semifinals, and a final round.  Heat winners advanced to the "A" final, with all other boats getting a second chance in the semifinals.  The top three from each semifinal also advanced to the "A" final, and competed for medals.  A placing "B" final was held for the other semifinalists.

Schedule

All times are British Summer Time (UTC+01:00)

Results

Heats
First boat qualified for the final, remainder go to semifinals.

Heat 1

Heat 2

Semifinals
The fastest three canoeists in each semifinal qualify for the 'A' final. The slowest two canoeists in each semifinal qualify for the 'B' final.

Semifinal 1

Semifinal 2

Finals

Final B

Final A

References

Canoeing at the 2012 Summer Olympics
Men's events at the 2012 Summer Olympics